"1998" is the second single by Australian musician Chet Faker from his debut studio album Built on Glass (2014). The song was released in Australia as a digital download on 5 May 2014 through Future Classic. It was voted No. 8 on the Triple J Hottest 100, 2014.

A remix featuring Banks was released on 29 July 2015.

The song was shortlisted for Song of the Year at the APRA Music Awards of 2015.

Music video
A music video to accompany the release of "1998" was first released on YouTube on 16 April 2014.

Use in media
The song was used in the 2014 snowboarding film Shredbots: The Movie (director Leo Cittadella).

Track listing

Charts

Release history

References

2014 singles
2014 songs
Banks (singer) songs
Chet Faker songs